Skuja Braden is an international artist collaboration between Ingūna Skuja and Melissa Braden. They create painted sculptures in porcelain.

Biographies and education
Skuja (born 1965) and Braden (born 1968) first met in school in 1994 at Humboldt State University. Skuja is from Latvia, and Braden is from Sacramento, California. Skuja attended Rīgas Applied Art College and the Latvian Art Academy both in Riga, Latvia, earning her B.A. in ceramics in 1992, before attending Humboldt State University for a year on a special exchange program, created by Latvian American Sculptor professor, Maris D. Benson.  Skuja received her M.A. in 2011 from Latvian Art Academy. Braden received two A.A. degrees from Sierra College in 1992, and two B.A.s in 1997 from Humboldt State University, studying painting, sculpture, and art history. She was studying for an M.A. in Film Production, when she traveled to Latvia to attend the Latvian Art Academy in 1999. Ingūna Skuja and Melissa Braden reconnected in Latvia in 1999 and began working collaboratively during the production of their show, "Here Kitty, Kitty! held at Čiris Gallery in Rīga. L w . Both artists had separate careers prior to beginning their collaboration. They currently reside in Latvia.

Artwork
All of their work is a combination of painting and ceramics, and they complete all steps of their collaborative process for creating their art together. They begin their process with sketches, and work together on the details of those drawings before incorporating clay into the work. Although Skuja Braden do use molds at times in their process, they never use commercial molds, rather they work from their own hand made pieces. They both work on the design, form, and final decoration of their pieces. Skuja Braden has also created outdoor installations.

Their work references a variety of subjects including human forms and faces, animals, and fairy tales. Their work and artistic philosophy covers many topics including feminism, Buddhism, and politics.

References 

20th-century women artists
Latvian sculptors
Latvian women sculptors
Living people
21st-century women artists
1965 births
1968 births